"Love Is All Around" is a song recorded by English rock band the Troggs, featuring a string quartet and a 'tick tock' sound on percussion, in D-major. Released as a single in October 1967, it was a top-ten hit in both the UK and US. 

"Love Is All Around" has been covered by numerous artists, including R.E.M., with whom the Troggs subsequently recorded their 1992 comeback album Athens Andover. R.E.M.'s cover was a B-side on their 1991 "Radio Song" single, and they also played it during their first appearance at MTV's Unplugged series that same year.  Wet Wet Wet's cover, for the soundtrack to the 1994 film Four Weddings and a Funeral, was an international hit and spent 15 consecutive weeks at number one on the UK Singles Chart.

Background and release
"Love Is All Around" was written by lead singer Reg Presley in around ten minutes, inspired by a television transmission of the Joystrings Salvation Army band's "Love That's All Around". It was recorded at Pye Studios with Larry Page producing and Alan McKenzie engineering. In the UK, the single was released on producer Larry Page's record label Page One. Earlier in 1967, the Troggs had intended to sever ties with the label and with Page, who was also their manager; however, after several months, they later decided to stay, though they changed manager. In the rest of Europe and North America, "Love Is All Around" by released on Fontana Records. The B-side "When Will the Rain Come" was written by drummer Ronnie Bond.

On the UK Record Retailer chart (since recognised as the official chart for this period), "Love Is All Around" spent a total of 14 weeks on the chart, reaching its peak at number 5 in the fourth week of November 1967. Whilst, in the US, although it was released there in November 1967, the song did not enter the Billboard Hot 100 until February 1968. It spent a total of 16 weeks on the chart, reaching its peak at number 7 in the third week of May. "Love Is All Around" also performed well in Europe, becoming a top-twenty hit in several countries, though failed to recapture the success of the Troggs' early singles such as "Wild Thing" and "With a Girl Like You". However, the song performed best in Southern Africa, where it topped the charts in South Africa and Rhodesia.

Critical reception
Reviewing for New Musical Express, Derek Johnson wrote that "Love Is All Around" is "set to a fairly slow rhythm, with an appealing scoring of guitars, violins and cellos – plus a melody that takes a little time to register, but once you've got it in your mind, it sticks there! Reg sings warmly and sincerely – departing from that rather stilted style which has characterised many of the group's discs". Peter Jones for Record Mirror described it as "optimistic and cheery and full of sentiment. Like the way the string section is insinuating itself as it builds. Rather a serene slice of Troggs". For Disc and Music Echo, Penny Valentine wrote that "although this has none of their trademark of suggestive hip-thumping rhythm and Reg Presley making love to the mike, it is quite pleasant. At the beginning, I liked it very much with its closed-up gentle sound and pretty strings. It would have been nice if something had happened, but it just went on, which I somehow think will be its downfall".

Billboard wrote that "this smooth, easy beat ballad with good lyric line should be just the commercial entry to put the British group back in their top selling bag in the U.S.". Cash Box described it as a "steady-moving, romance-slanted soft rocker... [that] could make noise".

Charts

Weekly charts

Year-end charts

Wet Wet Wet version

Richard Curtis approached Scottish band Wet Wet Wet about recording a cover song to soundtrack his film Four Weddings and a Funeral. The band got to pick between three choices of songs, the other two being "I Will Survive" by Gloria Gaynor and "Can't Smile Without You" by Barry Manilow. Singer Marti Pellow related that the decision to pick "Love is All Around" was an easy choice "because we knew we could make it our own". The song, which has a different introduction from the Troggs' version, was released on 9 May 1994.

Critical reception
Larry Flick from Billboard wrote, "Grinding rock ballad is etched with crunchy chords and vocals that conjure up memories of various old '60s pop favorites. Pledge-of-love lyrics will tug at the emotions of susceptible teen-age girls, as well as folks who want to relive fond moments from the notable Andie MacDowell film." Steve Baltin from Cash Box concluded that "the Scottish quartet have a charm about their music that makes it easy to see why they were chosen for the soundtrack of the surprise hit film. Supposedly they’re through conquering the rest of the world and now plan on concentrating on America. With this song, they're on their way." James Masterton commented in his weekly UK chart commentary, "Just when you thought all was lost, along comes a record to restore your faith in pop music." Pan-European magazine Music & Media deemed it a "sugary ballad", adding, "let's see if Marti Pellow can shake his hips like Reg Presley!"

Chart performance
On 15 May 1994, "Love Is All Around" entered the UK Singles Chart at number four. After climbing to number two the following week, it reached number one on 29 May. It then remained there for 15 weeks, the joint third-longest UK chart reign of all time (beaten only by Frankie Laine's "I Believe" which clocked up 18 weeks at the top during the 1950s and Bryan Adams' song from Robin Hood: Prince of Thieves, "(Everything I Do) I Do It for You", which was number one for 16 consecutive weeks in 1991) with Drake's "One Dance" which also stayed at the top for 15 weeks in 2016. "Love Is All Around" spent a further 20 weeks in the UK Top 75. Throughout its chart run, some radio stations banned the song, as many listeners were fed up of hearing it for so long. The band themselves eventually took the decision to delete the record from sale, but did not manage to tie with Adams as "Saturday Night" by Whigfield entered straight at the top on 11 September 1994, with Wet Wet Wet dropping to number two.

Reg Presley famously spent some of his songwriting royalties on crop circle research. Pellow also recorded his own version of the song for inclusion on his 2002 album Marti Pellow Sings the Hits of Wet Wet Wet & Smile.

In 2004, Pellow told the Daily Record, "We did everybody's head in the summer of 1994." Nevertheless, Pellow said, "I still think it's a brilliant record. Its strength is its sheer simplicity. Any band would give their eye teeth to have a hit record like that. I'm very proud of it."  In 2013, the year that Reg Presley died, "Love Is All Around" was named as the number one song in VH1's The Ultimate Movie Soundtrack: Top 100.

As of February 2021, it has sold 1.91 million copies in the United Kingdom, making it the country's best-selling love ballad of all time (including download and physical sales only), in front of songs including Bryan Adams's chart topping film theme (number 3 with 1.87 million copies sold) and "I Will Always Love You" by Whitney Houston (number 5 with 1.66 million sales).

Music video
A music video was made to accompany the song, which included projected footage from the film, and was directed by German director Marcus Nispel. It was later published on YouTube in August 2013. The video has amassed over 46 million views as of September 2021.

Track listings

 UK CD1
 "Love Is All Around"
 "I Can Give You Everything" (7-inch Arthur Baker soul remix)
 "Ain't No Stoppin'/Le Freak"

 UK CD2
 "Love Is All Around"
 "Is This Love" (live)
 "Love Is All Around" (TV mix)
 "I Can Give You Everything" (12-inch house mix)

 UK 7-inch and cassette single
 "Love Is All Around"
 "I Can Give You Everything" (7-inch Arthur Baker soul remix)

 US CD single
 "Love Is All Around" – 3:59
 "Cold Cold Heart" – 4:13

 US 7-inch single
A. "Love Is All Around" – 3:59
B. "Goodnight Girl" – 3:38

Credits and personnel
Credits are lifted from the UK CD1 liner notes and the Picture This album booklet.

Studio
 Recorded at The Brill Building (Glasgow, Scotland)

Personnel

 Wet Wet Wet – production, arrangement
 Graeme Clark – fretless bass, assorted basses, production
 Tommy Cunningham – drums, percussion
 Neil Mitchell – keyboards, piano
 Marti Pellow – vocals
 Reg Presley – writing

 Graeme Duffin – all guitars, co-production
 Bob Clearmountain – mixing
 Ian Morrow – programming
 Simon Vinestock – engineering
 Andrew Boland – string engineering

Charts

Weekly charts

Year-end charts

Decade-end charts

Certifications

Other cover versions and film uses
Prior to achieving international success with their single "These Eyes", "Love Is All Around" was covered by The Guess Who around 1967/68, and is available on compilation album This Time Long Ago. The song was also covered by Lotta Engbergs orkester as "Du ger mig av din kärlek" with Swedish lyrics written by Peter Stedt in 1994 while the Spanish rendering "El Amor Me Envuelve (Sabes Que Te Amo)" was recorded by Rocío Banquells for her 1999 album Fuerza Del Amor. Other covers include an easy-listening version by The Johnny Mann Singers on the 1968 Liberty Records album This Guy's in Love With You • The Look of Love.

The song appeared in Get Real (1998) directed by Simon Shore, screenplay by Patrick Wilde. After its use in Four Weddings and a Funeral, the song appeared in several of Richard Curtis' other projects, including the 2003 film Love Actually (reinvented as the Christmas song "Christmas Is All Around" performed by actor Bill Nighy as fictional rock star Billy Mack), and an episode of hit sitcom The Vicar of Dibley where it is performed by a church choir. It also played in a season two episode of Orphan Black and included on the TV show's official soundtrack. R.E.M. also covered "Love Is All Around" for the soundtrack to the 1996 film I Shot Andy Warhol. Australian band Human Nature covered the song on their 2018 album Romance of the Jukebox, and it was also was covered by American-Scottish new wave Talking Heads. The song was performed a cappella in the British teen sitcom Derry Girls.

See also
List of number-one singles in Australia during the 1990s
List of number-one hits of 1994 (Austria)
List of Dutch Top 40 number-one singles of 1994
List of European number-one hits of 1994
List of number-one singles in 1994 (New Zealand)
List of number-one songs in Norway
List of number-one singles and albums in Sweden
List of UK Singles Chart number ones of the 1990s
List of million-selling singles in the United Kingdom

References

1960s ballads
1967 singles
1967 songs
1994 singles
The Troggs songs
Wet Wet Wet songs
Talking Heads songs
Number-one singles in Australia
Number-one singles in Austria
Number-one singles in Denmark
European Hot 100 Singles number-one singles
Number-one singles in Finland
Number-one singles in Iceland
Dutch Top 40 number-one singles
Number-one singles in New Zealand
Number-one singles in Norway
Number-one singles in Rhodesia
Number-one singles in Scotland
Number-one singles in South Africa
Number-one singles in Sweden
Number-one singles in Switzerland
UK Singles Chart number-one singles
Ultratop 50 Singles (Flanders) number-one singles
Songs written by Reg Presley
Rock ballads
Fontana Records singles
Mercury Records singles
London Records singles
Music videos directed by Marcus Nispel